Brahma.com is a 2017 Indian Tamil-language fantasy film directed by Vijaykumar, starring Nakkhul and Ashna Zaveri in the leading roles, while Neetu Chandra, Upasana RC, Karthikeyan, Siddharth Vipin, K. Bhagyaraj, and Rajendran play other important roles. The film features music composed by Siddharth Vipin, editing by V. J. Sabu Joseph, and cinematography by Dipak Kumar Padhy. The film released on 15 December 2017 to negative reviews from critics.

Plot
Kameshwaran "Kamu" is a talented advertisement film director who works in a company owned by Vanangamudi, in which Kamu's cousin Rameshwaran "Ramu" is the CEO of that same company. Despite being more talented and skillful than Ramu, Kamu does not become the CEO because of a small mistake that he did the past. He rues over this issue and blames Lord Brahma for making his life not as he wished for. Kamu is in love with Manisha, an advertisement model, and she too reciprocates his feelings.

On Kamu's birthday, he happens to visit a temple for performing puja. As it is closing time for the temple, the temple priest asks Kamu to perform pooja at Brahma's sanctum. Kamu hallucinates that he is in Brahma Lok and  blames Him for all His actions and miseries He creates to people and prays for a better life. He goes to the office and Manisha wishes him Happy Birthday. She tells Kamu to be contended with God has given him in his life. During the break, he gets a friend request in Facebook from someone called "Brahma", who actually happens to be Lord Brahma. Thinking that someone is playing a prank on him, he accepts the request and begins a chat. The account then provides photos from his childhood up to the present moment as a proof. Kamu is shocked by this and informs this to his friends Jagan and Maya. They send a friend request to the account and they too get their old photos. Kamu remembers that the temple priest blessed him wish fulfillment. He now wants to become the CEO.

Maya unknowingly presses G+H (God - Human) keys on the laptop, reversing everything that happened in their lives until one year ago. Kamu is sent one year back to the very moment where he made the mistake which made him not get the CEO post. He gets an opportunity to reverse this. He becomes the CEO, and Ramu becomes the director. Confused, he is unable to accept his life at first as he is the CEO. Just then, Manisha enters the office and heads straight away to Ramu's office, as she is in love with him. Kamu feels bad that he lost her and returns home, amazed at his "new home". Just then, he is picked up by his boss's henchmen for his engagement, set to marry his boss's daughter to his dismay. The boss senses fishy and shows him a video that Kamu is the CEO just because he has agreed to marry the boss's daughter and has signed an agreement on it. Manisha is now love with Ramu instead of Kamu. Kamu loses his mind at the sight of Manisha being in love with Ramu.

Dejected, Ramu visits the Brahma temple and begs the God to reverse everything and foresees the future in his laptop and is shocked that he is about to marry his boss's daughter, in ICU clothes. He stabs himself as it would end all his agony. Next morning, he wakes up and is being carried in a wheel chair by his boss's henchmen to his marriage, in ICU clothes. He asks permission to change his clothes and escapes thereafter to the place where Manisha is about to register marry Ramu. Kamu repeats the dialog that Manisha told him during their meet.

Just then, two rain drop fall on the laptop, pressing the G+H Keys and it reverses to normal : He is in Ramu's place and vice-versa. The boss's henchmen arrive and take Ramu instead. Kamu and Manisha go to Brahma temple who now realizes that God made the things as they are for a reason. As they are about to leave, Kamu laughs at another man who comes running to the temple just as it is about to close. The priest sarcastically asks Kamu to leave as his work is finished. The priest is then revealed to Sage Narada.

Cast 

Nakkhul as Kameshwaran
Ashna Zaveri as Manisha
Neetu Chandra as Neetu Chandra
Siddharth Vipin as Rameshwaran
E. Karthikeyan as Veeramudi, Vanangamudi's son
K. Bhagyaraj as Gurakkal
Motta Rajendran as Vanangamudi
Jagan as Jagan
Upasana RC as Maya
Prema Priya as Karkuzhali, Vanangamudi's daughter
Sona Heiden as Vanangamudi's wife
Kausalya as Kamu's mother
M. J. Shriram as Parameshwaran, Kamu's father
Bala Saravanan in a guest appearance

Production 
In early March 2016, Nakkhul revealed that he had signed a film to be directed by Vijayakumar and the film would be in the "fantasy comedy genre". Actress Sakshi Agarwal revealed that she would also work on the film and collaborate again with the director who had introduced her in Ka Ka Ka Po (2016), though she was later left out of the project. The film began production in late September 2016, with Ashna Zaveri joining the cast to play the lead actress. Comedians Rajendran and Siddharth Vipin joined the team the following month, before the team moved to shoot in Pondicherry. The film was filmed in Chennai, Hong-Kong and Bangkok.

Soundtrack 
The soundtrack was composed by Siddharth Vipin, who had also acted in this film.

References

External links 
 

2017 films
Indian fantasy films
2010s Tamil-language films
Films scored by Siddharth Vipin
2017 directorial debut films
2017 fantasy films